Radio One is a live album by The Jimi Hendrix Experience. It was released posthumously in November 1988 by Rykodisc and compiles tracks recorded between February and December 1967 for broadcasts by BBC Radio. The album peaked at number 30 on the UK Albums Chart, while in the United States, it charted at number 119 on the Billboard 200. After Hendrix's family gained control of his legacy, Radio One was supplanted by the more comprehensive BBC Sessions in 1998.

Critical reception 

In a contemporary review for The Village Voice, Robert Christgau said Radio One is as good an introduction to Hendrix's music as his 1967 debut record Are You Experienced because while non-fanatics do not have to listen to different versions of the same songs, "Hendrix's versions do bear scrutiny like no other rock and roll." He was also impressed by the previously unreleased covers of "Hound Dog" and Curtis Knight's "Drivin' South", calling them first-rate. John Milward from the Chicago Tribune called it "one of the season's best new rock records", writing that it "supplements the first public stage of Hendrix's tragically brief evolution; the hard rock that forged his background in the blues and rhythm and blues into a sturdy platform for his instrumental pyrotechnics". Rolling Stone magazine's David Fricke was even more enthusiastic, deeming it an all-important Hendrix album that documents his artistry as it developed in its earliest stages, with recordings showcasing his blues roots, lyrical ballads, and frenzied guitar playing. He believed it covers a period of "accelerated evolution" for Hendrix in 1967, from his debut album earlier that year to his performance at the Monterey Pop Festival and his second record Axis: Bold as Love later that year:

In a retrospective review for AllMusic, Richie Unterberger recommended Radio One to genuine fans of Hendrix's music because of its unpolished yet exceptional sound and showcase of his ability to perform different styles of rock, soul, and the blues. Paul Evans and Nathan Brackett wrote in The Rolling Stone Album Guide (1992) that of the live recordings from "the deluge posthumous albums" released after Hendrix's death, Radio One was one of the "most exciting", along with Live at Winterland (1987) and Stages (1991).

Track listing
All tracks written by Jimi Hendrix except where noted.

Personnel
Jimi Hendrix – guitar, lead vocals
Noel Redding – bass, backing vocals on track 3
Mitch Mitchell – drums, backing vocals
Jimmy Leverton – backing vocals on track 11
Trevor Burton – backing vocals on track 11
Alexis Korner – slide guitar on track 12

See also 
 BBC Radio 1

References

External links 
 

Jimi Hendrix live albums
Live albums published posthumously
BBC Radio recordings
Rykodisc live albums
1988 live albums